Belenois thysa, the false dotted border, is a butterfly of the family Pieridae. It is found in Africa.

Adults are on wing year-round in warm areas.

The larvae feed on Capparis species and Maerua racemulosa.

Subspecies
Belenois thysa thysa (South Africa, Mozambique, Zimbabwe, Zambia, Malawi, Tanzania and the coast of Kenya)
Belenois thysa tricolor Talbot, 1943 (Ethiopia)
Belenois thysa meldolae Butler, 1872 (Angola, southern Zaire to Uganda, western Kenya, southern Sudan)

References

External links

Images representing Belenois thysa at BOLD
Seitz, A. Die Gross-Schmetterlinge der Erde 13: Die Afrikanischen Tagfalter. Plate XIII 12
Seitz, A. Die Gross-Schmetterlinge der Erde 13: Die Afrikanischen Tagfalter. Plate XIII 14
Seitz, A. Die Gross-Schmetterlinge der Erde 13: Die Afrikanischen Tagfalter. Plate XIII 15 as balangensis

Pierini
Butterflies of Africa
Butterflies described in 1855